Hogna ericeticola, known as the rosemary wolf spider,  is a species of spider in the family Lycosidae. It is endemic to Florida, in the United States.

References

Further reading
Wallace, Howard K. (1942). A study of the lenta-group of the genus Lycosa with descriptions of new species. Am. Mus. Novit. 1185: 1-21. PDF

Lycosidae
Spiders of the United States
Taxonomy articles created by Polbot
Spiders described in 1942
Taxobox binomials not recognized by IUCN